Rawl Nicholas Lewis (born September 5, 1974) is a West Indian cricketer. Lewis featured as a leg spinner for both the Windward Islands and the Windies in his cricketing career. As of 2016 Lewis holds the role as manager of the West Indies cricket team.

Playing career
As a native of Grenada, Lewis primarily featured as a leg spinner. He went on to captain the Windward Islands in their victorious 2000-01 Red Stripe Bowl campaign. He also played for Barrow Cricket Club in England, before being recalled to the West Indies squad for the 2005-06 tour of New Zealand.

Lewis was again recalled to the West Indies team in 2008 for the 2nd Test match against South Africa. He picked up 3 wickets in the match, which the West Indians eventually lost by seven wickets in Cape Town. He eventually played only 5 tests and 26 ODIs in his international career.

Managerial career
He was named as the Windies' interim manager for the 2016 ICC World Twenty20 in India. The West Indians went on to win the competition and lewis was thereafter appointed as the side's manager on a permanent basis.

Accolades
A stand at the Grenada National Cricket Stadium was jointly renamed in both Lewis and Junior Murray's honour.

Notes

1974 births
Living people
West Indies One Day International cricketers
West Indies Test cricketers
West Indies Twenty20 International cricketers
Grenadian cricketers
Windward Islands cricketers